Mimosa Echard is a French visual artist who lives and works in Paris.

Biography 
Born in 1986 in Alès, France, She grew up with her sisters in a hippy community in the Cévennes. She studied at the École nationale supérieure des arts décoratifs in Paris, from which she graduated in 2010.

In 2019, she was a resident at Villa Kujoyama in Kyoto. Since 2021, she has been the head of the painting workshop at the Beaux-Arts de Paris.

Echard is the winner of the 2022 edition of the Marcel Duchamp Prize.

She is represented by the galleries Chantal Crousel (Paris) and Martina Simeti (Milan).

Work 
Echard's artistic research explores the boundaries between nature and pop culture. Thanks to a multidisciplinary practice that ranges from painting, to sculpture, to video and digital, she creates fictional worlds with psychedelic traits through the accumulation and assemblage of objects, images as well as botanical references from the Cévennes (her native region), a region with a long history of counter-cultural and community experiments initiated in the 1970s.

Collaboration  is important in reading her work: ”Collaborations are always a way of creating collective events and experiences outside of the validation system of art and institutions”. One example is the "open-source experimental exploration game" proposed by Echard as part of her exhibition at Palais de Tokyo in 2022, accessible only online. Designed in collaboration with a software developer, musicians and actors, the “scenario imagines an engaging and humorous approach to interspecies relations”.

Her work has been the subject of several solo exhibitions, including Sporal, at Palais de Tokyo in 2022, or Sluggy Me at the Collection Lambert, in Avignon in 2021, but also in various galleries including the Samy Abraham gallery in Paris

Solo exhibitions (selection) 

 2010: Pour changer de forme, diploma, École nationale supérieure des arts décoratifs, Paris
 2012: Booster, Modules Pierre-Bergé - Yves-Saint-Laurent Foundation, curated by Daria de Beauvais, Palais de Tokyo, Paris
 2012: Oiseau / hasard, Bernard-Anthonioz Art House, Nogent-sur-Marne
 2014: Destroy the Image and You Will Break the Enemy, Project room, Chez Valentin Gallery, Paris
 2015: Asterico Mariposa, Fire Place, Barcelona
 2015: Dead is the New Life, Le Plateau (center of contemporary art) / Frac, Île-de-France
 2015: Mithril, with Jonathan Martin, Circonstance Gallery, Nice
 2015: Une robe profonde d'empathie, with Jean-Marie Perdrix, Samy Abraham Gallery, Paris
 2016: iDeath, Samy Abraham Gallery, Paris
 2017: Friends, Samy Abraham Gallery, Paris
 2017: Pulsion Potion, Cell Project Space Gallery, London
 2018: Mauve Dose, Maternity Ward of the Geneva HUG, Geneva
 2019: Pulpe, with Shanta Rao, curated by Raphaël Brunet, Ecole municipale des beaux-arts, Édouard-Manet Gallery, Gennevilliers
 2019: Luca, with Michel Blazy, Dortmunder Kunstverein, Dortmund
 2019: Cracher une image de toi/ Spitting an image of you, with Ryan Foerster and Hannah Buonaguro, VNH Gallery, Paris
 2020 Un bout de toi, Salomon, Martina Simeti, Milan, Italy
 2021 Numbs, Chantal Crousel Gallery, Paris, France
 2021 Sluggy Me, Lambert Collection, Avignon, France
 2022 Sporal, Palais de Tokyo, Paris, France

Awards and selections 
 2015 Finalist, Le Meurice Prize for Contemporary Art, Paris, France
 2018 Finalist, BFSP Sculpture Prize, Fonderia Artistica Battaglia, Milan, Italy
 2021 Acquisition of the Marval Collection Fund, Italy
 2021 Ettore and Ines Fico Prize, Turin, Italy
 2022: Marcel Duchamp Prize, Centre Georges-Pompidou, Paris

Residencies 
 2011: Thailywood artist residency, Chonburi (Thailand)
 2014 Lafayette Anticipations, Corporate Foundation of the Lafayette Galleries, Paris, France
 2014: Villa Arson, Nice
 2014/15: Cité internationale des arts, Paris
 2019: Villa Kujoyama, Kyoto
 2022 Villa Albertine, Miami, US

Collections 
Her works are part of public and private collections including: the Pompidou Center, the Louis Vuitton Foundation, the Paris Museum of Modern Art, the National Centre of Plastic Arts in Paris, the Corporate Foundation of the Lafayette Galleries in France, the Ettore Fico Museum in Turin, Italy; and the Samdani Art Foundation, in Dhaka, Bangladesh

Notes and references

Bibliography 
 Daria de Beauvais and Frédéric Grossi (eds.) (texts by Pip Wallis, Mimosa Echard, Daria de Beauvais), Sporal, Les Presses du réel, 2022 (French/English)

Press 
 Matthieu Jacquet, "Dans l'incroyable atelier de Mimosa Echard, l’enchanteresse qui transforme l'art et la nature", Numéro, 9 April 2021
 Lise Guéhenneux, "Mimosa Echard", Crash Magazine, Edition 93, March 2021, p. 60-71 
 Charles Aubin, "Horn of Plenty: Mimosa Echard", Mousse Magazine, October 2020
 Roxana Azimi, "Jeune pousse. Mimosa Echard, naturel butineur”, Le Monde, January 2017

External links 

 Sporal video game website

21st-century French painters
21st-century French sculptors
21st-century French women artists
French digital artists
French video artists
Living people
1986 births
People from Alès